The 2019 Internazionali Femminili di Brescia was a professional tennis tournament played on outdoor clay courts. It was the twelfth edition of the tournament which was part of the 2019 ITF Women's World Tennis Tour. It took place in Brescia, Italy between 3 and 9 June 2019.

Singles main-draw entrants

Seeds

 1 Rankings are as of 27 May 2019.

Other entrants
The following players received wildcards into the singles main draw:
  Deborah Chiesa
  Elisabetta Cocciaretto
  Sara Errani
  Jessica Pieri

The following player received entry using a protected ranking:
  Romina Oprandi

The following players received entry from the qualifying draw:
  Lucia Bronzetti
  Federica Di Sarra
  Océane Dodin
  Paula Cristina Gonçalves
  Julia Grabher
  Dalila Spiteri

Champions

Singles

 Jasmine Paolini def.  Diāna Marcinkēviča, 6–2, 6–1

Doubles

 Andrea Gámiz /  Paula Cristina Gonçalves def.  Anastasia Grymalska /  Giorgia Marchetti, 6–3, 4–6, [12–10]

References

External links
 2019 Internazionali Femminili di Brescia at ITFtennis.com
 Official website

2019 ITF Women's World Tennis Tour
2019 in Italian tennis